Luc Mares (born 3 October 1996) is a Dutch professional footballer who plays as a centre back for Start in the Norwegian 1. divisjon.

He previously played for Fortuna Sittard and MVV.

References

External links
 

1996 births
Living people
Dutch footballers
Fortuna Sittard players
MVV Maastricht players
Eerste Divisie players

Association football central defenders
Footballers from Maastricht
Dutch expatriate footballers
Expatriate footballers in Norway
Dutch expatriate sportspeople in Norway